Qush Khaneh (also Romanized as Qūsh Khāneh; also known as Galeh Zīr) is a village in Sangar Rural District, in the Central District of Faruj County, North Khorasan Province, Iran. At the 2006 census, its population was 327, in 101 families.

References 

Populated places in Faruj County